Poul Andersen (16 February 1928 – 8 December 2010) was a Danish footballer who competed in the 1952 Summer Olympics.

References

1928 births
2010 deaths
Association football midfielders
Danish men's footballers
Olympic footballers of Denmark
Footballers at the 1952 Summer Olympics
Boldklubben af 1893 players